New Athos Cave Railway, also known as New Athos Subway, is an underground electric railroad serving the New Athos Cave, in the town of New Athos, Abkhazia.

Route
The line is a single track and electrified narrow gauge railway with a third rail. It starts at the entrance of the caves, nearby Psyrtscha station of the Abkhazian railway. From the Entrance Gate station, it reaches two cave halls: Apsny Hall (or Abkhazia) and Anakopea Hall. Apsny station serves to lead the tourists at the beginnings of the show cave, and Anakopea to bring them back to the entrance gate, at the end of the tour. The line counts a depot just before Entrance station, and a service tunnel between it and Apsny.

Rolling stock
The railway has three power-concentrated battery electric multiple units built by the Railroad Machinery Plants of Riga in Latvia, including two Ep «Tourist» trains and the newly built Ep-563 train, and also the auxiliary mining battery-electric locomotive ARP8 which is used in case of malfunction of EMU's motor car. Two Ep trains were built in 1975 and later both of them were modernized in Moscow in 2005 and 2009. In 2013, due to the wear of these trains, the railway management ordered a new train in Riga, which was built the next year. Since 2014 this it been the only train in use. The first Ep train is based at Anakopea station for doubling the Ep 563 train in case of malfunction. Another Ep train is based at the depot.<ref name. Each train consists of 6 cars, including 1 power car with driver's cab, motors and power equipment and 5 trailer cars for passengers (4 intermediate cars and 1 observation car in the end). Both models run either on a third rail with 380 V DC or batteries with 240 V DC being used for short unelectrified sections at switches without a third rail, and also at passenger stations where the third rail has no voltage for safety reasons.

Gallery

See also
New Athos Cave

References

External links

 

Rail transport in Abkhazia
Rapid transit in Georgia (country)
Underground rapid transit in Georgia (country)
Gudauta District
Railway lines opened in 1975
900 mm gauge railways in Abkhazia